The Atlantic Fleet was a naval fleet of the Royal Navy. It existed for two separate periods; 1909 until 1914, and then 1919 until 1932.

History
On 14 December 1904 the Channel Fleet was re-styled the 'Atlantic Fleet'. The Atlantic Fleet lasted until 1912 when rising tensions with Germany forced the Royal Navy to relook at fleet formations and the Atlantic Fleet became the 3rd Battle Squadron. The Atlantic Fleet was based at  Gibraltar to reinforce either the Channel Fleet or the Mediterranean Fleet, from January 1905 to February 1907. It remained at Gibraltar until April 1912.

The Atlantic Fleet was again formed after the end of World War I, when British naval forces were reorganised to reflect the changed economic and political situation in Europe. The fleet was created upon the disbandment of the Grand Fleet in April 1919, absorbing many, but not all of its elements. It was placed under a Commander-in-Chief, who for part of that year held the title of Commander-in-Chief Atlantic and Home Fleets, before the Home Fleet became the Reserve Fleet and a totally separate command.  became the Fleet's flagship and served in that capacity until 1924.

The fleet never fought in a naval battle in its short history. The fleet's only point of note in history was in 1931, during the Invergordon Mutiny. Sailors of the fleet openly refused to obey orders over a dispute on pay sparked by the government at the time. The fleet's short history ended in 1932, when the Admiralty having been shaken by the events of the Invergordon Mutiny, renamed the fleet, as the Home Fleet.

Senior officers

Commanders-in-Chief Atlantic Fleet
The Commander-in-Chief's title was "Commander-in-Chief, Atlantic Fleet" between 1910-1912, however, the post was also sometimes styled as "Vice-Admiral Commanding, Atlantic Fleet".

Included:

Included:

Rear-Admiral, Second-in-Command, Atlantic Fleet
The post of Rear-Admiral Second-in-Command, Atlantic existed during the first formation of the Atlantic Fleet from June 1904 to August 1912. There were no admirals appointed as seconds-in-command in the fleet's second iteration.

Postholders included:

Commodore/Rear-Admiral (D) Commanding Destroyer Flotillas, Atlantic Fleet
Post holders included:

Chief of Staff, Atlantic Fleet
Second Formation included

Components

First formation
Distribution of the Fleet first formation included:

Second formation
Distribution of the Fleet second formation included:

References

External links
Fleet Organisation  Accessed March 2010

Fleets of the Royal Navy
Military units and formations established in 1909
Military units and formations disestablished in 1932
Military units and formations of the Royal Navy in World War I